Gun laws in Vermont regulate the sale, possession, and use of firearms and ammunition in the U.S. state of Vermont.

Vermont formerly had very few gun control laws, but in 2018, the state enacted laws requiring background checks for private sales, raising the minimum age to purchase firearms to 21 (16 if purchasing a long gun from a person who is not a federally licensed firearm dealer and the purchaser presents a certificate of satisfactory completion of a hunter safety course that is approved by the Vermont Commissioner of Fish and Wildlife), banning the sale or possession of handgun magazines that hold more than 15 rounds and rifle magazines that hold more than 10 rounds, banning the possession of bump stocks, and allowing police to seek a court order to seize guns from anyone deemed an extreme risk.  The portion of the law dealing with high capacity magazines has recently been challenged as unconstitutional under Vermont's constitution based upon the right to bear arms (Chapter I, Article 16) and the equal protection clause/"common benefits" clause (Chapter I, Article 7).

The open or concealed carry of firearms is generally unregulated. The state's rural character, along with its strong hunting and outdoor sports traditions, have contributed to the state's historically permissive gun policies. Gun dealers are required to keep a record of all handgun sales. State law preempts local governments from regulating the possession, ownership, transfer, carrying, registration or licensing of firearms:  

The State neither issues nor requires a permit to carry a weapon on one's person, openly or concealed. This is known in the U.S. as constitutional carry. The phrase "constitutional carry" reflects the view that the Second Amendment to the U.S. Constitution does not abide restrictions on gun rights, including the right to carry or bear arms. Vermont is the only state where this has always been the case (hence the alternative term Vermont carry). Vermont law does not distinguish between residents and non-residents of the state; both have the same right to carry without prior state approval while in Vermont.

History
The Vermont Constitution of 1777, dating well before the Bill of Rights to a time when Vermont was an independent republic, guarantees certain freedoms and rights to the citizens: "That the people have a right to bear arms for the defense of themselves and the State – and as standing armies in time of peace are dangerous to liberty, they ought not to be kept up; and that the military should be kept under strict subordination to and governed by the civil power." The city of Rutland passed an ordinance to prohibit the carrying of weapons without permission from the mayor or chief of police but this was struck down by the Vermont Supreme Court in its 1903 State v. Rosenthal decision.

In January 2013, the City of Burlington, Vermont's most populous municipality, approved an ordinance banning assault weapons and certain magazines within its limits. An attempt at gun control at the local level, the ordinance would likely be challenged in court if enforced because Vermont has state preemption of local restrictions. The proposed ordinance was never fully enacted.

Some localities have adopted Second Amendment sanctuary resolutions.

Summary table

State constitutional provisions
Article I, Section 16 of the Constitution of Vermont states: That the people have a right to bear arms for the defence of themselves and the State — and as standing armies in time of peace are dangerous to liberty, they ought not to be kept up; and that the military should be kept under strict subordination to and governed by the civil power.

Firearm carry

Vermont state law does not distinguish between the open or concealed carry of any firearm. The Vermont Statutes restrict where civilians may carry firearms, such as courthouses, schools, and school buses, but not how they may carry them. The only exception to this is in Title 10, which states that a "person shall not carry or possess while in or on a vehicle" a loaded long gun, but makes no mention of "openly" or "concealed."  The Vermont Supreme Court, in 1903, held that an individual had the right, under the Vermont Constitution, to carry a weapon, openly or concealed, for self-defense (State v. Rosenthal).

Notes

References

Vermont law
Vermont